Coming in from the Dark is the sixth studio album by New Zealand soul musician Hollie Smith, released in October 2021. The album reached number one on the  New Zealand Albums Chart.

Production

The album was intended to be recorded in 2020, however due to the COVID-19 pandemic in New Zealand, recording sessions were postponed until 2021. Smith self-produced the record, and featured a number of New Zealand musicians on the album, including the New Zealand Symphony Orchestra, rapper Raiza Biza, classical crossover trio Sol3 Mio and soul singer Teeks. After the New Zealand Symphony Orchestra recorded instrumental backing to three songs on the album, Smith was inspired to incorporate strings throughout the entire record.

The song "You" was the first track written for the album in 2016, inspired by the Syrian refugee crisis and the 2016 United States elections. "Heaven Only Knows" was written in 2020 during the George Floyd protests, and "Damage Done" expresses Smith's frustration at resistance met against the Black Lives Matter and the MeToo movements. The song "Billy" was written as a tribute to Smith's first love, who died of lymphoma.

Release and promotion

"Coming in from the Dark" featuring the New Zealand Symphony Orchestra was the first single released from the album, on 30 July 2021. The song was recorded bilingually, with both English and Māori language versions featured on the single. This was followed by "What About" featuring Raiza Biza in September, and "Something Good" in early October.

Smith toured Coming in from the Dark in July 2022, performing seven dates across New Zealand. The tour was intended to be held in November 2021, but was postponed to February 2022, and eventually held in July.

Track listing

Credits and personnel

Raiza Biza – featured artist (5), songwriter (5)
Courtney Burchell – artwork
Chris Chetland – mastering
Steve Dykes – photography
Jordan Foster – artwork
Mike Gibson – recording assistant
Melody Gumbley – violin
Daniel Hayles – piano, keyboards, synth
Graham Kennedy – recording (1, 9, 11)
Johnny Lawrence – bass, synthesiser (minimoog)
Ben Lawson – recording (5–6)
Yotam Levy – cello
Toby Lloyd – mixing engineer, vocal recording
Moses Mackay – featured vocalist (11)
Nic Manders – recording (11)
Darren Mathiassen – drums
Courtney Mayall – backing vocals
Jeremy Mayall – string arrangements, quartet and background vocal recording
Hamish McKeich – conductor (1, 9, 11)
Jol Mulholland – guitar (5–8)
Chris Nation – viola
New Zealand Symphony Orchestra – featured artist (1, 9, 11)
Amitai Pati – featured vocalist (11)
Pene Pati – featured vocalist (11)
Alex Pelham-Waerea – backing vocals
Ryan Prebble – recording
Jess Ruck-Nu'u – backing vocals
Hollie Smith – arranger, recording (additional vocals), producer, songwriter, vocalist
Sol3 Mio – featured artist (11)
Sharon Stephens – violin
Tyrell Tamaki – backing vocals
Teeks – featured artist (6)
Emma Thornton – backing vocals

Charts

Weekly charts

Year-end charts

References

2021 albums
Hollie Smith albums